The men's road race at the 1953 UCI Road World Championships was the 20th edition of the event. The race took place on Sunday 30 August 1953 in Lugano, Switzerland. The race was won by Fausto Coppi of Italy.

Final classification

References

Men's Road Race
UCI Road World Championships – Men's road race